Mikołaj Kozakiewicz (24 December 1923, Slonim – 22 November 1998) was a Polish politician, publicist and sociologist.

Member of United People's Party, deputy to the last communist Sejm (1985–1989). Member of the Polish Round Table Agreement from the government side. Later joined the Polish People's Party and Partia Ludowo-Demokratyczna, member of Sejms 1989–1991 and 1991–1993. Marshal of the Sejm in the Contract Sejm (10th and the last communist Sejm), from 23 Junve 1989 to 24 November 1991.

Professor, author of many articles and books, mostly from the realm of sociology. Activist in many non-governmental organizations, he supported the homosexual rights movement and legalization of soft drugs.

1923 births
1998 deaths
Burials at Powązki Military Cemetery
People from Slonim
People from Nowogródek Voivodeship (1919–1939)
United People's Party (Poland) politicians
Polish People's Party politicians
Marshals of the Sejm of the Third Polish Republic
Members of the Contract Sejm
Members of the Polish Sejm 1991–1993
Polish sociologists
Polish Round Table Talks participants